In linguistics, a word sense is one of the meanings of a word. For example, a dictionary may have over 50 different senses of the word "play", each of these having a different meaning based on the context of the word's usage in a sentence, as follows:

In each sentence different collocates of "play" signal its different meanings. 

People and computers, as they read words, must use a process called word-sense disambiguation to reconstruct the likely intended  meaning of a word. This process uses context to narrow the possible senses down to the probable ones. The context includes such things as the ideas conveyed by adjacent words and nearby phrases, the known or probable purpose and register of the conversation or document, and the orientation (time and place) implied or expressed. The disambiguation is thus context-sensitive.

Advanced semantic analysis has resulted in a sub-distinction. A word sense corresponds either neatly to a seme (the smallest possible unit of meaning) or a sememe (larger unit of meaning), and polysemy of a word of phrase is the property of having multiple semes or sememes and thus multiple senses.

Relations between senses
Often the senses of a word are related to each other within a semantic field. A common pattern is that one sense is broader and another narrower. This is often the case in technical jargon, where the target audience uses a narrower sense of a word that a general audience would tend to take in its broader sense. For example, in casual use "orthography" will often be glossed for a lay audience as "spelling", but in linguistic usage "orthography" (comprising spelling, casing, spacing, hyphenation, and other punctuation) is a hypernym of "spelling". Besides jargon, however, the pattern is common even in general vocabulary. Examples are the variation in senses of the term "wood wool" and in those of the word "bean". This pattern entails that natural language can often lack explicitness about hyponymy and hypernymy. Much more than programming languages do, it relies on context instead of explicitness; meaning is implicit within a context. Common examples are as follows: 
 The word "diabetes" without further specification usually refers to diabetes mellitus. 
 The word "angina" without further specification usually refers to angina pectoris. 
 The word "tuberculosis" without further specification usually refers to pulmonary tuberculosis. 
 The word "emphysema" without further specification usually refers to pulmonary emphysema. 
 The word "cervix" without further specification usually refers to the uterine cervix.

Usage labels of "sensu" plus a qualifier, such as "sensu stricto" ("in the strict sense") or "sensu lato" ("in the broad sense") are sometimes used to clarify what is meant by a text.

Relation to etymology
Polysemy entails a common historic root to a word or phrase. Broad medical terms usually followed by qualifiers, such as those in relation to certain conditions or types of anatomical locations are polysemic, and older conceptual words are with few exceptions highly polysemic (and usually beyond shades of similar meaning into the realms of being ambiguous).

Homonymy is where two separate-root words (lexemes) happen to have the same spelling and pronunciation.

See also

denotation
semantics – study of meaning
lexical semantics – the study of what the words of a language denote and how it is that they do this
word-sense induction – the task of automatically acquiring the senses of a target word
word-sense disambiguation – the task of automatically associating a sense with a word in context
lexical substitution – the task of replacing a word in context with a lexical substitute
sememe – unit of meaning
linguistics – the scientific study of language, which can be theoretical or applied.
sense and reference
functor - a mathematical term which is the overarching generalization of the intentionality behind the class of transfers of intelligability at two different levels of analysis.

References

External links
"I don’t believe in word senses" – Adam Kilgarriff (1997) – archive
WordNet(R) – a large lexical database of English words and their meanings maintained by the Princeton Cognitive Science Laboratory

Lexical semantics
Semantics
Word-sense disambiguation
Philosophical logic